The Jewish National Bloc was a political alliance in Latvia in the 1920s.

History
The bloc contested the 1920 Constitutional Assembly elections as the Jewish Bloc, winning five seats. For the 1922 elections it changed its name to the Jewish National Bloc, but won only two seats in the 1st Saeima. The bloc was later disbanded, with the three parties contesting the 1925 elections alone. Mizrachi won a single seat in the 2nd Saeima, whilst the other two failed to pass the electoral threshold.

See also
Jews in Latvia
Agudas Israel
Ceire Cion

References

Political parties of minorities in Latvia
Defunct political party alliances in Latvia
Jews and Judaism in Latvia
Jewish Latvian history
Jewish political parties